In baseball statistics, a putout (denoted by PO or fly out when appropriate) is given to a defensive player who records an out by tagging a runner with the ball when he is not touching a base, catching a batted or thrown ball and tagging a base to put out a batter or runner (a force out), catching a thrown ball and tagging a base to record an out on an appeal play, catching a third strike (a strikeout), catching a batted ball on the fly (a fly out), or being positioned closest to a runner called out for interference. The left fielder (LF) is one of the three outfielders, the defensive positions in baseball farthest from the batter. Left field is the area of the outfield to the left of a person standing at home plate and facing toward the pitcher's mound. The outfielders have to try to catch long fly balls before they hit the ground or to quickly catch or retrieve and return to the infield any other balls entering the outfield. The left fielder must also be adept at navigating the area of left field where the foul line approaches the corner of the playing field and the walls of the seating areas. Being the outfielder closest to third base, the left fielder generally does not have to throw as far as the other outfielders to throw out runners advancing around the bases, so they often do not have the strongest throwing arm, but their throws need to be accurate. The left fielder normally plays behind the third baseman and shortstop, who play in or near the infield; unlike catchers and most infielders (excepting first basemen), who are virtually exclusively right-handed, left fielders can be either right- or left-handed. In the scoring system used to record defensive plays, the left fielder is assigned the number 7.

The overwhelming majority of putouts recorded by left fielders, almost to exclusivity, result from catching fly balls. However, in extraordinary circumstances, an outfielder may record a putout by receiving a throw to force out or tag out a runner while covering a base if one or more infielders are out of position to retrieve an errant throw, or by tagging a runner stranded between bases in a rundown play; however, even in such circumstances, outfielders will more typically act as a backup to infielders than cover a base themselves. Historically, putout totals for outfielders rose after 1920 with the end of the dead-ball era; the same circumstances which had kept home run totals low, such as overused baseballs and legal adulterations including the spitball, had similarly hindered the type of power hitting which lent itself to long fly balls. But as strikeout totals have risen in baseball in recent decades, the frequency of other defensive outs including flyouts has declined; as a result, putout totals for outfielders have likewise declined. Through the 2022 season, 17 of the top 20 single-season left field putout totals were recorded between 1920 and 1992; none of the top 39 have been recorded since 1997.

Because game accounts and box scores often did not distinguish between the outfield positions, there has been some difficulty in determining precise defensive statistics before 1901; because of this, and because of the similarity in their roles, defensive statistics for the three positions are frequently combined. Although efforts to distinguish between the three positions regarding games played during this period and reconstruct the separate totals have been largely successful, separate putout totals are unavailable; players whose totals are missing the figures for pre-1901 games are notated in the table below. Because they are expected to cover more territory in the outfield than their counterparts on either side, often being the fastest player of the three, center fielders typically record the highest putout totals; left fielders usually record slightly more putouts than right fielders due to the ball being more frequently hit to the left side of the field. Barry Bonds is the all-time leader in career putouts as a left fielder with 5,226. Rickey Henderson (5,215) is second all-time, and the only other player with over 5,000 career putouts as a left fielder.

Key

List

Stats updated through the 2022 season

Other Hall of Famers

Notes

References

External links

Major League Baseball statistics
Putouts as a left fielder